Sheikh Ali al-Qaradaghi (born in Qaradagh, Sulaymaniyah, Kurdistan, Iraq) is an influential Sunni scholar of Islam, an expert on Sharia and Fiqh combined with Islamic economics. He is a professor of Jurisprudence at the Faculty of Sharia and Islamic Studies of the Qatar University in Doha and he has a Qatari citizenship.

Life 
Al-Qaradaghi is the Secretary General of the International Union of Muslim Scholars (IUMS, current headquarters in Doha, the capital of Qatar, headed by Sheikh Yusuf al-Qaradawi). He is Vice President of the Association of Muslim Schools of Tehran and a member of many other Islamic organizations, including the International Islamic Fiqh Academy, the Organisation of Islamic Cooperation and the European Council for Fatwa and Research. He is the founder and president of the Islamic Kurdish League, founded in 1988, and President of the Board of Trustees of the University of Human Development in the city of Sulaimaniyah.
He is the chairman of the Sharia supervisory board of the Qatar First Bank (QFB) and a member of the Sharia supervisory boards of several Islamic institutions and banks, including Qatar National Bank, Dubai Islamic Bank, Doha Bank Islamic Branch, Qatar Insurance, Gulf Investment House and Ahli United Bank. He started a study of Sharia at the University of Baghdad and graduated with a doctorate at the Al-Azhar University in Cairo.
He is the author of numerous works on the Islamic economy and Comparative Jurisprudence.
He has been granted numerous awards and honors and is a member of numerous councils, committees and associations.
Ali al-Qaradaghi took part in the International Theological Conference "Islamic Doctrine against Radicalism" in Moscow on 25–26 May 2012.

Media reviews 
According to Chechen historian and political analyst Mairbek Vatchagaev (the article published by the American Jamestown Foundation), Ali al-Qaradaghi and the International Union of Muslim scholars for Moscow play an important role in internal Russian Islamic stability:
 Russian authorities do not simply want Sheikh Ali al-Qaradaghi to declare the jihad in the North Caucasus to be illegal. Moscow regards this international Islamic organization as a potential means to control part of Russia's own Muslim population, which could issue fatwas on important questions of Islam and be recognized. Moscow, however, fails to see that only those Muslims who already recognize the official Muslim clergy will listen to al-Qaradaghi. That portion of the Muslim community in Russia which deems cooperation between the authorities and the Muslim clergy unacceptable will not be influenced by al-Qaradaghi.

He is an active supporter of Yusuf al-Qaradawi and his project "Muhammad: A Mercy for All" [16], and called upon all Muslims to support this project financially to IslamOnline.net (IOL) (with donations to the Qatar Islamic Bank in Doha, Qatar) and to give moral support:
  We have decided to launch a big Web site about Muhammad (peace and blessings be upon him): A Mercy for All under the supervision of IslamOnline.net, the greatest global Islamic Web site on the Internet. [...] We call upon our brothers and sisters in Islam to support this project financially, especially that the eminent scholar Sheikh Yusuf Al-Qaradawi, who supervises the implementation of the project, has given a fatwa to the effect that it is permissible to pay zakah, sadaqah and doubtful money to IslamOnline.net as a donation. Sheikh Al-Qaradawi, moreover, has described this project as 'jihad of the modern age.' We also call upon Muslims to give moral support to the project by inviting the friends of IslamOnline.net to participate voluntarily in its activities and services. We are going to prepare special programs to show how they can share in this respect.“
On his reaction to the murder of Muslim students in Chapel Hill shortly after the Paris attacks, Spiegel (the Mirror) reported:
 The Secretary General of the International Union of Islamic Leaders in Qatar, Ali al-Karadaghi, criticized the silence of the" international media on this "terrorist attack". "Are the leaders of the whole world going to honour the victims?" he wrote on Twitter alluding to the huge mourning ceremony for the victims of the Islamic attacks in Paris in January.

Notes

Year of birth missing (living people)
Living people
21st-century Muslim theologians
Academic staff of Qatar University
Islam in Europe
Islamic banking
Sunni Islam
Qatari politicians
Iraqi politicians
International Union of Muslim Scholars members
Al-Azhar University alumni